Trichilia blanchetii is a species of plant in the family Meliaceae. It is endemic to Brazil.  It is threatened by habitat loss.

References

blanchetii
Endemic flora of Brazil
Endangered plants
Endangered biota of South America
Taxonomy articles created by Polbot